In enzymology, a retinol isomerase is an enzyme that catalyzes the chemical reaction

all-trans-retinol  11-cis-retinol

Hence, this enzyme has one substrate, all-trans-retinol, and one product, 11-cis-retinol. These enzymes are alternatively referred to as retinoid isomerases.

This enzyme belongs to the family of isomerases, specifically cis-trans isomerases.  The systematic name of this enzyme class is all-trans-retinol 11-cis-trans-isomerase. This enzyme is also called all-trans-retinol isomerase.  This enzyme participates in retinol metabolism.

In vertebrates, RPE65 is the active retinol isomerase in the visual cycle. A lack of RPE65 function results in congenital blindness in children (specifically Leber congenital amaurosis). Emixustat, a partial inhibitor of RPE65, is currently in FDA clinical trials for the treatment of age-related macular degeneration.

References

 
 
 

EC 5.2.1
Enzymes of unknown structure